Darluis Andrés Paz Ferrer (born 26 March 2002) is a Venezuelan footballer who plays as a midfielder for Loudoun United.

Career statistics

Club

Notes

References

2002 births
Living people
Venezuelan footballers
Venezuelan expatriate footballers
Venezuela youth international footballers
Association football midfielders
Deportivo La Guaira players
Loudoun United FC players
Venezuelan expatriate sportspeople in the United States
Expatriate soccer players in the United States
Sportspeople from Maracaibo
21st-century Venezuelan people